Afghanistan International Bank (AIB) is the largest bank in Afghanistan and the only Afghan bank with international transfer to all countries, with its head office in Kabul. The bank has thirty seven branch offices in the major cities of the country. 
AIB has international shareholders, two Afghan business groups, one Afghan/American business group. It opened in 2004.

AIB operates primarily as a commercial wholesale bank and targets, among others, multilateral organizations, UN entities, NGOs, embassies, foreign military forces, Afghan governmental institutions, foreign and domestic companies, to become their clients.

The bank operates from AIB House, which is located in Third Microryan, Hamid Karzai International Airport Road of Kabul City. Bank has its branches in Kabul, Mazar-e-Sharif, Herat, Kandahar, Jalalabad, Kunduz, Pole-e-Khumri, Helmand, Nimruz and Khost.

Afghanistan International Bank holds $790 million in deposits — about 20% of Afghanistan's deposit base. The Wall Street Journal has described the company as "one of the country's biggest lenders".

References 

 Afghan Bankers' Delegation Visits Meezan House. The Nation. Accessed April 4, 2015. 
 Afghanistan International Bank Looks to UAE-Afghan Ties. CPI Financial. Accessed April 4, 2015. 
 Citi and Afghanistan International Bank Enter into Banking Agreement. Economics Week. Accessed April 4, 2015.

External links 

 

Banks of Afghanistan
Banks established in 2004